Iphidozercon is a genus of mites in the family Ascidae.

Species
 Iphidozercon gibbus (Berlese, 1903)      
 Iphidozercon poststigmatus Gwiazdowicz, 2003      
 Iphidozercon validus Karg, 1996

References

Ascidae